This is a list of power stations in Ivory Coast. The majority of electricity generation (about 72.5%) in Ivory Coast is by power stations that burn natural gas; the remaining 27.5% of the country's generation is hydroelectricity. As of 2016, installed electric generation capacity totalled 1,975 megawatts (MW). Electric generation exceeded the country's needs; 5.31 billion kilowatt hours (kWh) of electricity was generated in 2005, of which the country consumed only 2.9 billion kWh. Export of electricity is through the West African Power Pool.

Natural gas 
List of natural gas powered power stations in Ivory Coast.

Hydroelectric 
Partial list of hydroelectric power stations in Ivory Coast.

Solar 
Partial list of solar power stations in Ivory Coast.

See also 

 Energy in Ivory Coast
 List of power stations in Africa
 List of largest power stations in the world

References 

Ivory Coast
Power stations
 
https://dlca.logcluster.org/plugins/viewsource/viewpagesrc.action?pageId=853599